Moon Over Montana is a 1946 American Western film directed by Oliver Drake and written by Louise Rousseau. The film stars Jimmy Wakely, Lee "Lasses" White, Jennifer Holt, Jack Ingram, Louise Arthur and Stanley Blystone. The film was released on February 16, 1946, by Monogram Pictures.

Plot

Cast           
Jimmy Wakely as Jimmy Wakely
Lee "Lasses" White as Lasses White
Jennifer Holt as Gwynn Randall
Jack Ingram as Sam Barkeley
Louise Arthur as Babs Turner
Stanley Blystone as Joseph Colton
Buster Slaven as Phil Barkley 
Terry Frost as Yuma Smith
Eddie Majors as Dodger
Bob Duncan as Brick Donovan
Fiddlin' Arthur Smith as himself
Woody Woodel as himself

References

External links
 

1946 films
American Western (genre) films
1946 Western (genre) films
Monogram Pictures films
Films directed by Oliver Drake
American black-and-white films
1940s English-language films
1940s American films